Hsu Chia-yuan or Kyo Kagen (許家元; born 24 December 1997) is a Taiwanese Go player who plays professionally in Japan.

Biography
Hsu was born in Taipei, Taiwan. After graduating from elementary school, he moved to Japan in 2010 to study as an insei with Takabayashi Takuji 6 dan as his teacher. Hsu became a Nihon Ki-in professional in 2013, based on the results of the professional qualification league held in late 2012.

His first championship in an official tournament was at the Shinjin-O (King of the New Stars) in 2015.

In 2018, he won the 43rd Gosei, his first major title. He won the title match 3–0 against Iyama Yuta, ending Iyama's reign as the simultaneous holder of all seven major Japanese titles. At the time of his win, Hsu had been a professional for only 5 years 4 months. This broke the record of 6 years 0 months set by Ida Atsushi in 2015 for being the fastest to go from becoming professional to winning a major title.

In his 2019 Gosei title defense, he was defeated 3–2 by Hane Naoki. Later that year, Hsu was the challenger for the 45th Tengen, and lost 3–2 to Iyama Yuta. Hsu challenged Shibano Toramaru for the 68th Oza in 2020, and was defeated 3–1.

In 2021, he won the 59th Judan, his second major title, in a 3–2 victory over Shibano Toramaru. He successfully defended the Judan title in 2022 against Yu Zhengqi, who is also from Taiwan.

Promotion record

References

External links
Nihon Ki-in profile
Hsu Chiayuan on Go Ratings

1997 births
Living people
Japanese Go players
Taiwanese Go players
Sportspeople from Taipei